The Longreach Region is a local government area in Central West Queensland, Australia. Established in 2008, it superseded three previous local government areas that had existed for more than a century.

It has an estimated operating budget of A$22.3m.

Traditionally, pastoral activities, tourism, and rural education have been the areas of focus within the region, with a major agricultural college and attractions such as the Australian Stockman's Hall of Fame and the Qantas Founders Outback Museum.

History 
Longreach Region lay on the traditional tribal lands of the Iningai. Iningai (also known as Yiningay, Muttaburra, Tateburra, Yinangay, Yinangi) is an Australian Aboriginal language spoken by the Iningai people. The Iningai language region includes the landscape within the local government boundaries of the Longreach Region, particularly the towns of Longreach, Barcaldine, Muttaburra and Aramac as well as the properties of Bowen Downs and catchments of Cornish Creek and Alice River.

Kuungkari (also known as Kungkari and Koonkerri) is a language of Western Queensland. The Kuungkari language region includes the landscape within the local government boundaries of Longreach Shire Council and Blackall-Tambo Shire Council.

Prior to the 2008 amalgamation, the Longreach Region existed as three distinct local government areas:

 the Shire of Longreach;
 the Shire of Ilfracombe;
 and the Shire of Isisford.

In July 2007, the Local Government Reform Commission released its report recommending that the three areas amalgamate. Ilfracombe was rated by a Treasury sustainability review as very weak with a negative outlook, while the other two were rated as moderate. All three councils opposed the amalgamation. The legislation passed to effect the merger on 10 August 2007. A Local Transition Committee made up of staff and councillors of the three dissolving entities was formed to manage the process. On 15 March 2008, the three Shires formally ceased to exist, and elections were held on the same day to elect councillors and a mayor to the Regional Council.

In January 2019, it was decided to reduce the number of localities within Longreach Region by amalgamating the localities to the north and west of the town of Longreach into the locality of Longreach. The localities amalgamated were: Camoola, Chorregon, Ernestina, Maneroo, Morella, Tocal, and Vergemont. As a consequence of this amalgamation, the Longreach Region has only three localities: Longreach, Ilframcombe and Isisford.

On 10 September 2021, a new locality called Yaraka was created around the town of Yaraka, the land being excised from the locality of Isisford, to avoid confusion and restore historical connections.

Mayors

Councillors 
The council members elected in 2020 were: 

The council members elected in 2016 were: 

The divisions were abolished for the 2012 election, with all councillors elected by the whole region. The council members elected in 2012 were:

For the council election in 2008, the region was divided into six divisions, each electing one councillor. The council members elected in 2008 were:

Towns and localities 
The Longreach Region includes the following settlements:

Longreach area:
 Arrilalah
 Camoola (former)
 Chorregon  (former)
 Ernestina (former)
 Longreach
 Maneroo (former)
 Morella (former)
 Tocal  (former)
 Vergemont  (former)

Ilfracombe area:
 Ilfracombe

Isisford area:
 Emmet
 Isisford
 Yaraka

Amenities
Longreach Regional Council operates public libraries at Ilfracombe, Isisford, and Longreach.

Population
The populations given relate to the component entities prior to 2008 and combined population after amalgamation. The population has been in steady decline since the early 1960s.

References

External links 

 Maps showing the localities before and after the January 2019 amalgamations (archived before and after on 28 July 2019)

 
Local government areas of Queensland